Enchanted Scepters is a point-and-click adventure game, released in 1984.

The player must find the four fire, earth, air and water scepters hidden across the Kingdom, and return them to the Wizard. The gameplay is much like a text adventure game; the screen shows a picture of the room the player is currently in and to the right is a description of the room. The description mentions any items that can be used or picked up, but to do that the player must click on the item in the picture. The pictures change as the player moves to a new scene. There is no movement in the picture, but enemies are inserted when encountered, accompanied by sound effects. The player can then choose from a drop down menu whether to flee, and which way (north, south, east or west and occasionally up or down), or to fight, and with which weapon.

Enchanted Scepters was created with the World Builder adventure authoring system which was later released to consumers in 1986.

Legacy
In 1990, a fangame titled Lost Crystal was released that was also developed using the World Builder engine and that took up the plot of Enchanted Scepters.

References

External links
 Ye Olde Infocomme Shoppe
 

1984 video games
Classic Mac OS games
Classic Mac OS-only games
First-person adventure games
Silicon Beach Software games
Single-player video games
Video games developed in the United States